Poh Seng Song (born 30 January 1983) is an athlete from Singapore who specialises in the 100 metres sprint and 4 x 100 metres relay.

Participating in the 2004 Summer Olympics, he achieved seventh place in his 100 metres heat, thus missing out on a placing in Round 2 of the event.

Seng Song received his education in Anglo-Chinese School. As of December 2005, he is an undergraduate at the Singapore Management University.

References

External links
 
 
 
 

1983 births
Athletes (track and field) at the 2004 Summer Olympics
Living people
Singaporean male sprinters
Singaporean people of Chinese descent
Anglo-Chinese School alumni
Singapore Management University alumni
Olympic athletes of Singapore
Southeast Asian Games medalists in athletics
Southeast Asian Games silver medalists for Singapore
Southeast Asian Games bronze medalists for Singapore
Competitors at the 2003 Southeast Asian Games
Competitors at the 2005 Southeast Asian Games
21st-century Singaporean people